The following article is a summary of the 2015 Indonesia national football team results

Men's Senior Football Team

Record

Managers of 2015
Included just matches against country.

Goal scorers

Fixtures and results

Friendly Matches

International Friendly

Non-International Friendly (against clubs)

Men's under-23 Football Team

Record

Managers of 2015
Included just matches against country.

Goal scorers

Fixtures and results

Friendly Matches

International Friendly 

Notes

Non-International Friendly

2016 AFC U-23 Championship qualification

Group H

2015 Southeast Asian Games

Group A

Semi-final

Bronze medal match

Men's under-19 Football Team

Record

Managers of 2015
Included just matches against country.

Goal scorers

Fixtures and results

Friendly Matches

International Friendly

Non-International Friendly (against clubs) 
Source:

Men's under-17 Football Team

Record

Managers of 2015
Included just matches against country.

Goal scorers

Fixtures and results

Friendly Matches

International Friendly

Non-International Friendly (against clubs) 
Source:

2015 AFF U-16 Youth Championship

Women's Senior Football Team

Record

Managers of 2015
Included just matches against country.

Goal scorers

Fixtures and results

Friendly Matches

International Friendly

Non-International Friendly (against clubs)

2015 AFF Women's Championship 

Group A

References 

2015
2015 in Indonesian football
Indonesia